Jahan Tum Wahan Hum is a 1968 Pakistani Urdu black-and-white film directed by Pervaiz Malik. It cast Waheed Murad, Shabnam, Nirala, Saiqa, Rukhsana, Tamanna and Mehmood Ali.

Cast
 Shabnam
 Waheed Murad
 Nirala
 Saiqa
 Asifa
 Tamanna
 Neelofar
 Latif Charlie
 S.M. Saleem
 Azad
 Agha Sarwar

Release
Jahan Tum Wahan Huum was released on 1 November 1968 in Pakistani cinemas.

Music
The music of the film is composed by Robin Ghosh and the songs are written by Masroor Anwar. Playback singers are Ahmad Rushdi and Mala. 

A list of film songs is as follows:
Mujhe talash thi jis ki... by Ahmed Rushdi and Mala
Usey dekha usey chaha... by Ahmed Rushdi
Aye mere dil deewane... by Ahmed Rushdi
Husn dekha jo tumhara to khuda yaad aya... by Ahmed Rushdi

References

External links 
 

1968 films
1960s Urdu-language films
Pakistani romantic musical films
Pakistani black-and-white films
Films scored by Robin Ghosh

Urdu-language Pakistani films